Charles Segars Barnes (born October 1, 1995) is an American professional baseball pitcher for the Lotte Giants of the KBO League. He was drafted by the Minnesota Twins in the 4th round of the 2017 Major League Baseball draft.

Amateur career
A native of Sumter, South Carolina, Barnes attended Sumter High School. He went on to play college baseball at Clemson University, and in 2016, he played collegiate summer baseball with the Hyannis Harbor Hawks of the Cape Cod Baseball League. Barnes was drafted by the Minnesota Twins in the fourth round, 106th overall, of the 2017 Major League Baseball draft.

Professional career

Minnesota Twins
Barnes made his professional debut with the rookie-level Elizabethton Twins, and also played for the Single-A Cedar Rapids Kernels that year, posting a cumulative 4–2 record and 2.61 ERA. In 2018, he played for the High-A Fort Myers Miracle, recording a 6–6 record and 2.81 ERA in 23 appearances. Barnes split the 2019 season between Fort Myers, the Double-A Pensacola Blue Wahoos, and the Triple-A Rochester Red Wings, pitching to a 7–8 record and 4.88 ERA with 124 strikeouts in 131.0 innings of work.

Barnes did not play in a game in 2020 due to the cancellation of the minor league season because of the COVID-19 pandemic. Barnes was assigned to the Triple-A St. Paul Saints to begin the 2021 season, and logged a 5–2 record and 3.88 ERA in 11 games.

On July 17, 2021, Barnes was selected to the 40-man roster and promoted to the major leagues for the first time. He made his MLB debut that day as the starting pitcher against the Detroit Tigers, and took the loss after allowing the game's only run, a solo home run off the bat of Tigers outfielder Robbie Grossman.

Barnes appeared in 9 games for the Twins, posting a 5.92 ERA and 20 strikeouts. On November 19, 2021, Barnes was designated for assignment by the Twins. He was outrighted to Triple-A St. Paul on November 24.

Lotte Giants
On December 23, 2021, Barnes signed with the Lotte Giants of the KBO League. On November 23, 2022, Barnes re-signed a one-year deal for the 2023 season.

References

External links

1995 births
Living people
People from Sumter, South Carolina
Baseball players from South Carolina
Major League Baseball pitchers
Minnesota Twins players
Clemson Tigers baseball players
Hyannis Harbor Hawks players
Elizabethton Twins players
Cedar Rapids Kernels players
Fort Myers Miracle players
Pensacola Blue Wahoos players
Rochester Red Wings players
St. Paul Saints players